The Sag-od massacre, also known as the Las Navas massacre, was the mass murder of 45 men, women and children in Barrio Sag-od in Las Navas, Northern Samar, on September 15, 1981, by 18 heavily armed security men of the San Jose Timber Corp. who were also members of the Special Forces of the Civilian Home Defense Force (CHDF).

See also 
 Martial law under Ferdinand Marcos

References 

Massacres in 1981
1981 in the Philippines
September 1981 events in Asia
Presidency of Ferdinand Marcos
Massacres under the Marcos dictatorship
Massacres in the Philippines